The Knebworth Festival is a recurring open-air rock and pop concert held on the grounds of the Knebworth House in Knebworth, England. The festival first occurred in July 1974 when The Allman Brothers Band, The Doobie Brothers and other artists attracted 60,000 people.

Since then the venue has hosted numerous outdoor concerts, featuring artists including The Rolling Stones, Lynyrd Skynyrd, Pink Floyd, Genesis, Frank Zappa, Led Zeppelin, The Beach Boys, Deep Purple, Queen (their 1986 concert at the venue was the last with Freddie Mercury), Status Quo, Paul McCartney, Eric Clapton, Elton John, Phil Collins, Robert Plant, Dire Straits, Mike Oldfield, Red Hot Chili Peppers, Robbie Williams, and Oasis.

Major concerts
The Rolling Stones played in front of an estimated 200,000 at Knebworth in August 1976.
In 1979, Led Zeppelin performed at Knebworth for two gigs, their first concerts in the United Kingdom since 1975. The band reportedly played to record crowds in excess of 200,000 people, even though official admission records only list 109,000 people. The New Barbarians, Ron Wood's solo outfit with Keith Richards played at the second show on 11 August. Support bands included Fairport Convention and Chas and Dave.
The Beach Boys headlined the 1980 Knebworth concert, which would later prove to be the last UK performance of the band's original lineup. Drummer Dennis Wilson would die in 1983 from drowning. Their set was released in 2002 as Good Timin': Live at Knebworth England 1980.
The 1985 event was the first UK gig by the re-formed Deep Purple. 
On 9 August 1986, Queen performed their last concert with their original lineup (Freddie Mercury, Brian May, Roger Taylor and John Deacon)  in what was Freddie Mercury's final show with the band. Biographer Mark Blake writes, "the official attendance was 120,000, but in reality the audience was closer to 200,000." Queen roadie Peter Hince states, "At Knebworth, I somehow felt it was going to be the last for all of us", while Brian May recalled Mercury saying "I’m not going to be doing this forever. This is probably the last time." Queen did not perform live again until after Mercury's death, at his tribute concert at Wembley Stadium in April 1992.
On 30 June 1990, the park was the location for The Silver Clef Award Winners Concert which was recorded with highlights released on LP and compact disc, along with home video on VHS and laserdisc later that year, with a newly remixed edition released on DVD in 2002. A Blu-ray edition with upscaled SD video and high resolution audio (LPCM stereo and DTS-HD Master Audio 5.1) was released in Europe in 2015. It included the performances of artists including Pink Floyd, Cliff Richard & The Shadows, Tears for Fears, Eric Clapton, Dire Straits, Elton John, Paul McCartney, Ray Cooper, Robert Plant (w/ Jimmy Page), Phil Collins, Status Quo and Genesis. Pink Floyd's complete set was released with newly remixed audio on multiple formats (180-gram 45 r.p.m. double LP, compact disc and digital platforms) on 30 April 2021.

In 1996, Oasis, who were supported by The Charlatans, Kula Shaker, Manic Street Preachers, The Bootleg Beatles, The Chemical Brothers, Ocean Colour Scene and The Prodigy, played two shows with an audience of 125,000 per night. Over 2.5 million people had applied for tickets for the shows, meaning the possibility of 20 sold-out nights. It remains the largest ever demand for concert tickets in British history.
In 2003, Robbie Williams headlined at the main stage in Knebworth over a three-day period, drawing crowds of over 375,000, and a further 3.5 million who watched live on television and online. Other acts to perform on the same stage were The Darkness, Ash, Moby and Kelly Osbourne. This was reputedly the biggest UK pop concert ever and caused a huge traffic jam on the A1(M) as thousands of cars tried to reach the venue during Friday evening rush hour. A subsequent album, entitled Robbie Williams – Live at Knebworth, was released, and reached number two in the UK charts. A DVD entitled What We Did Last Summer, was released afterwards.
In 2009, Metallica and Linkin Park headlined the first ever UK Sonisphere Festival. Other bands included Nine Inch Nails, Heaven & Hell, and Avenged Sevenfold, whose late drummer The Rev would play his final show during the festival.  The festival took place again in 2010 with Rammstein and Iron Maiden headlining plus performances from other big acts such as Alice Cooper, Iggy and the Stooges and Mötley Crüe. In 2011, the festival hosted the first UK performance of the Big 4 bands of thrash metal.

Concert history

References

Bibliography

External links

Knebworth House website
Knebworth Festival History 1974-1986

Knebworth House
Knebworth Festival
Knebworth Festival
Festival